Pleurothallis applanata is a species of orchid plant

Distribution 
It is native to Ecuador.

It is an epiphyte, found at elevations of 800 to 1800 meters.

Taxonomy 
It was named by Carlyle A. Luer, and Stig Dalström, in Lindleyana 11: 147, in 1996.

References 

applanata